No One's Words is the name of the debut album by Israeli progressive rock act Ephrat. The album was produced by Omer Ephrat and mixed/mastered by Steven Wilson.

Track listing

"The Show" - 10:31
"Haze" - 7:13
"Better Than Anything" - 8:26
"Blocked" - 4:55
"The Sum of Damage Done" - 9:36
"Real" - 18:58

Personnel
Lior Seker - vocals
Omer Ephrat - keyboards, guitars, flute
Gili Rosenberg - bass
Tomer Z - drums
Asaf Dar - cello
David Segal - double bass
Barak Ben-Tsur - Percussion
Petronella Nettermalm - vocals
Daniel Gildenlöw - vocals
Steven Wilson - mixing, mastering

2008 debut albums
Ephrat albums
Inside Out Music albums